Záryby is a municipality and village in Prague-East District in the Central Bohemian Region of the Czech Republic. It has about 1,000 inhabitants.

Administrative parts
The village of Martinov is an administrative part of Záryby.

References

External links

 (in Czech)

Villages in Prague-East District